Elizabeth Hanna is a Canadian film and television actress, most notable for her voice acting work in animated films.  She later complemented her voice acting skills by becoming a speech-language pathologist. She is also the voice of Miss Biscuit on Corn & Peg.

History

Early history
Elizabeth Hanna spent her early years in Ottawa, where she graduated from Glebe Collegiate Institute.  She attended Carleton University, where she graduated with a major in philosophy.  She was then accepted into the National Theatre School of Canada, based in Montreal, Quebec, from which she graduated in 1977.

Acting career
Hanna then relocated to Toronto, where she continues to be based.  She initially commenced her professional acting career appearing in various Toronto stage productions.  She also began to obtain commercial voice-over work, contributing to national television and radio advertising campaigns.  This led to the development of her career as a voice actor in a number of animated films associated with such well-known characters as Little Bear, the Care Bears, Babar the Elephant, and Sailor Moon.  Much of Hanna's voice acting work has been in productions of the Nelvana group.

As a speech-language pathologist
Hanna later complemented her voice acting and voiceover skills by obtaining a Master of Health Science degree, majoring in Speech-Language Pathology, from the University of Toronto.  She commenced practising as a Speech-Language Pathologist in 1996 while continuing her voice and other contributions to film and television, as well as voice contributions to video games.

Filmography 
Corn & Peg (2019-2020) (TV Series) - Miss Biscuit (voice)
Wishenpoof! (2018) - Grammie (voice)
Mia and Me (2011-2012) - Panthea (voice)
"The Dating Guy" (2009) (TV Series) 
Friends and Heroes (2008-2009) - Luciana (voice)
"The Future Is Wild" (2007) (TV Series, Discovery Kids)
Care Bears: Big Wish Movie (2005) - Big Wish (voice)
Rolie Polie Olie (2004) - Kindly Lady (voice, in "A Polie Family Frolic," "Has Anybody Seen My Coo?" and "Babies Go Home.")
Rolie Polie Olie: The Baby Bot Chase (2003) - Kindly Lady (voice)
Elliot Moose (2001) - (Voiceover, only in these sorts of episodes, "The Cat Nap/Elliot Mapleberry/The Magic Pond/Boo!".)
The Little Bear Movie (2001) - Hen (voice)
Franklin and the Green Knight: The Movie (2000) - Mrs. Fox/Eagle (voice)
Mega Man Legends 2 (2000) (Video Game)  - Servbots (voice)
Mythic Warriors: Guardians of the Legend (2000) (TV Series) - Artemis (voice)
The Misadventures of Tron Bonne (1999) (Video Game) - Servbot #1 (voice)
Babar: King of the Elephants (1999) - Madame (voice)
Silver Surfer (1998) (TV Series) - Kill the Troll (voice)
Mega Man Legends (1997) (Video Game) - Servbots (voice)
Franklin (1997) - Duck (voice, in "Franklin in the Dark")/Mrs. Fox (voice)
Sailor Moon (1995) (TV Series)  - Doom Tree/Tree of Life (voice)
The Magic School Bus (1995) (TV Series)  - Judge (voice, only in "Taking Flight".)
Little Bear (1995-2003) (TV Series) - Hen (voice)
Wild C.A.T.s (1994–1995) (TV Series)
Tales from the Cryptkeeper (1993–1994) (TV Series) - The Old Witch (voice)
"Woman on the Run: The Lawrencia Bembenek Story" (1993) (Television Movie)
Dog City (1992–1995) (TV Series) - Rosie O'Gravy (voice)
Beetlejuice (1989–1991) (TV Series) - Delia Deetz/Miss Shannon (voice)
The Nutcracker Prince (1990) - Marie/Miss Schaeffer/Doll (voice)
The Raccoons (1990) (TV Series) - Nicole Raccoon (voice)
Piggsburg Pigs! (1990) (TV Series) 
The Super Mario Bros. Super Show! (1989) (TV Series) - Triforce of Wisdom (voice)
Babar: The Movie (1989) - Queen Celeste/Lady (voice)
Street Legal (1989) (TV Series)
Alfred Hitchcock Presents (1989) (TV Series)
Babar (1989) (TV Series) - Madame (voice)
C.O.P.S. (1988–1989) (TV Series) - Suzy "Mirage" Young (voice)
Double Standard (1988) (Television Movie)
Police Academy (1988) (TV Series) - Mademoiselle Diva (voice)
Hello Kitty's Furry Tale Theater (1987) (TV Series) - Grandma Kitty/Mama Kitty (voice)
The Care Bears Adventure in Wonderland (1987) - Queen of Wonderland (voice)
The Centurions (1986–87)
Check It Out! (1985) (TV Series) 
The Wizard of Oz (1982)
Hank Williams: The Show He Never Gave (1981)

References

External links
 

Actresses from Ottawa
Canadian television actresses
Canadian voice actresses
Living people
National Theatre School of Canada alumni
Speech and language pathologists
Year of birth missing (living people)